A capsule (from Latin capsula, "small box or chest"), or stadium of revolution, is a basic three-dimensional geometric shape consisting of a cylinder with hemispherical ends. Another name for this shape is spherocylinder.

It can also be referred to as an oval although the sides (either vertical or horizontal) are straight parallel.

Usages 
The shape is used for some objects like containers for pressurised gases, windows of places like a jet, software buttons, building domes (like the U.S. Capitol, having the windows of the top hat that depict The Apotheosis of Washington inside designed with the appearance of the shape & placed in an omnidirectional pattern), mirrors, and pharmaceutical capsules.

In chemistry and physics, this shape is used as a basic model for non-spherical particles. It appears, in particular as a model for the molecules in liquid crystals or for the particles in granular matter.

Formulas
The volume  of a capsule is calculated by adding the volume of a ball of radius  (that accounts for the two hemispheres) to the volume of the cylindrical part. Hence, if the cylinder has height ,

.
 

Generalization

A capsule can be equivalently described as the Minkowski sum of a ball of radius  with a line segment of length . By this description, capsules can be straightforwardly generalized as Minkowski sums of a ball with a polyhedron. The resulting shape is called a spheropolyhedron.

Related shapes

A capsule is the three-dimensional shape obtained by revolving the two-dimensional stadium around the line of symmetry that bisects the semicircles.

References

Elementary shapes